Grönholm is a surname. Notable people with the surname include:

 Greta Grönholm, Finnish sprint canoer
 Kurt Grönholm, Finnish Olympic rower
 Maj-Len Grönholm, Finnish politician
 Marcus Grönholm, Finnish rally driver
 Niclas Grönholm, Finnish rally driver
 Ossi-Petteri Grönholm, Finnish ice hockey defenceman
 Peter Grönholm, Finnish Olympic fencer
 Sari Grönholm, Finnish Olympic snowboarder
 Ulf Grönholm, Finnish rally driver

See also
 The Method (2005 film), also known as El Método Grönholm (The Grönholm Method)